The Passage is an American thriller television series based on the trilogy of novels by Justin Cronin. It spans years in the life of Amy Bellafonte, as she moves from being manipulated in a government conspiracy to protecting humankind in a post-apocalyptic vampire future. The series premiered on January 14, 2019. The Passage was cancelled after one season on May 10, 2019.

Synopsis
The Passage focuses on Project Noah, a secret medical facility where scientists are experimenting with a dangerous virus that could lead to the cure for all disease, but also carries the potential to wipe out the human race. When a young girl, Amy Bellafonte, is chosen to be a test subject, Federal Agent Brad Wolgast is tasked with bringing her to Project Noah. Ultimately, however, Wolgast becomes her surrogate father, as he tries to protect her at any cost. Brad and Amy's journey will force them to confront Project Noah's lead scientist, Major Nichole Sykes, and the hardened ex-CIA operative in charge of operations, Clark Richards, whom Brad trained. It likewise brings them face-to-face with a dangerous new race of beings confined within the walls of Project Noah, including former scientist Tim Fanning and death-row inmate Shauna Babcock. As Project Noah's scientists home in on a cure that could save humanity, these new beings begin to test their own powers, inching one step closer to an escape that could lead to an unimaginable apocalypse.

Cast
Mark-Paul Gosselaar as Brad Wolgast
Saniyya Sidney as Amy Bellafonte
Jamie McShane as Tim Fanning, a medical doctor and philanthropist
Caroline Chikezie as Nichole Sykes, a military doctor who heads Project Noah
Emmanuelle Chriqui as Lila Kyle
Brianne Howey as Shauna Babcock
McKinley Belcher III as Anthony Carter
Henry Ian Cusick as Jonas Lear, a doctor
Vincent Piazza as Clark Richards

Production

Development
In July 2007, Fox 2000 paid $1.75million for the film rights to The Passage by Justin Cronin. In September 2009, John Logan was announced to be writing a screenplay with Ridley Scott attached to direct. In April 2011, Matt Reeves was announced as director. In June 2011, Jason Keller was hired to rewrite Logan's screenplay. The producers decided that the project would work better as a television series and in November 2016, Fox gave a pilot production commitment. Reeves said that the book was "not adaptable as a movie". In January 2017, Fox ordered the pilot. In August 2017, Fox Entertainment president David Madden told Deadline that there would be potential re-shoots to the pilot. In February 2018, it was revealed that there would be re-shoots of the pilot, to take place in March in Atlanta. In May 2018, Fox ordered the pilot to series.

Casting
In June 2017, Mark-Paul Gosselaar, Saniyya Sidney, Genesis Rodriguez, Brianne Howey, B. J. Britt and Jennifer Ferrin were announced to have been cast in the pilot. On February 8, 2018, it was announced that the characters played by Rodriguez, Britt and Ferrin would be written out of the show and that three new characters, Tim Fanning, Nichole Sykes and Lila Kyle, would be added. On February 14, 2018, Jamie McShane was cast as Fanning while Caroline Chikezie was cast as Sykes. The next day Emmanuelle Chriqui was cast as Kyle.

Episodes

Reception

Critical reception
The series holds an approval rating of 62% based on 26 reviews, with an average rating of 7.02/10 on Rotten Tomatoes. The website's critical consensus reads, "Strong performances from leads Mark-Paul Gosselaar and Saniyya Sidney can't course correct The Passage'''s wayward plot and feeble tone." Metacritic, which uses a weighted average, assigned the series a score of 62 out of 100 based on 17 critics.

Lucy Mangan of The Guardian'' praised the father–daughter dynamic between Brad and Amy and the series' execution of a "daft" storyline. Alison Herman, writing for The Ringer, said that the novels were a poor fit for network television and criticized some of the show's deviations from the source material.

Ratings

References

External links
 
 
 

2010s American drama television series
2019 American television series debuts
2019 American television series endings
American thriller television series
English-language television shows
Fox Broadcasting Company original programming
Television shows based on American novels
Television series by 20th Century Fox Television
Television series by Scott Free Productions
Television shows set in California
Television shows set in Colorado
Vampires in television
Post-apocalyptic television series